The Robert J. Manning School of Business is the business school at the University of Massachusetts Lowell located in Lowell, Massachusetts. The Manning School is accredited by AACSB International (AACSB).

The school offers eight undergraduate majors along with MBA, MS, Ph.D., and graduate certificate programs. As of fall 2018, the school had 2,500 undergraduate students, 901 graduate students, and 79 full-time faculty members.

History
Introduced as the Division of Business and Economics in 1959 at Lowell Technological Institute, the Manning School of Business was originally designed to offer business classes to engineering students in the Industrial Technology program. The College of Management Science was developed in 1971 and offered a range of degree programs in business administration. The college was renamed the Manning School of Business in 2011 and is named after Robert J. Manning, the chairman and CEO of MFS Investment Management. The school was named after Manning, a 1984 graduate of UMass Lowell, after he and his wife donated $5 million to the university.

The Manning School of Business is housed in the Pulichino Tong Business Center, which opened in April 2017. The building is named after alumnus John Pulichino '67 and his wife, Joy Tong, who committed more than $4 million in scholarship funds for Manning School students. The Pulichino Tong Business Center has over 54,000 square feet of classroom, office, and conference space. The facility features a four-story atrium, technology enhanced classrooms, seminar rooms, faculty offices, a finance laboratory simulating a trading room floor, meeting spaces and collaborative study areas.

Rankings 
U.S. News & World Report ranked the Manning School 30th in the nation for Best Online Graduate Programs (excluding MBA) in 2018.  At the MBA level, the Manning online MBA is ranked 29th in the nation by Poets & Quants and 51st in the nation by US News.  The MBA program is also ranked as Tier One by CEO Magazine in their 2018 Global MBA rankings.  The school's undergraduate program is nationally ranked in the top 200 by U.S. News. Princeton Review lists the Manning School of Business as one of their best 296 business schools.

Academics

Undergraduate programs 

 BS in Business Administration
 Accounting
 Analytics and Operations Management
 Management
 Entrepreneurship
 Finance
 International Business
 Management
 Management Information Systems
 Marketing

Graduate programs 

MBA
MS in Accounting
MS in Business Analytics
MS in Entrepreneurship
MS in Finance
Foundations of Business graduate certificate
Business Analytics graduate certificate
Financial Management graduate certificate
New Venture Creation graduate certificate

Doctorate programs 
Ph.D. with concentrations in:
Accounting
Entrepreneurship
Finance
Leadership/Organization Studies
Management Information Systems
Management Science
Marketing

Graduation Rates 
The Graduation Rates for freshman in the Fall semester of 2011 from The Manning School of Business was 33% for a 4-year Graduation Rate and for a 6-year Graduation Rate for the same semester was 54.5%.

Research 
The Manning School of Business hosts the following research centers:

 The Donahue Center for Business Ethics and Social Responsibility
 The Jack M. Wilson Center for Entrepreneurship
 Behavioral Lab and Participant System

Organizations 
The Manning School of Business 13 Student Leadership Organizations:

 Accounting Society
 Beta Gamma Sigma 
 Business Analytics Society
 College DECA
 Entrepreneurial Ventures Association
 Finance Society
 International Business Society
 Joy Tong Women in Business
 Management Society
 Manning Consulting Group
 Marketing Society 
 Real Estate Network Association 
 Salesforce Leaders Group

References

External links

University of Massachusetts Lowell
Business schools in Massachusetts